Raisedon Zenenga was the United Nations Deputy Special Representative for Somalia. Prior to this appointment of 5 December 2014 by United Nations Secretary-General Ban Ki-moon, Mr. Zenenga was the United Nations Deputy Special Representative in South Sudan.

Biographical Information
Mr. Zenenga has had a distinguished career with the United Nations. Prior to working with the United Nations Mission in South Sudan, he was a senior manager with the United Nations in New York for ten years and worked closely with United Nations peacekeeping missions. Mr. Zenenga is a graduate of the University of Zimbabwe where he studied public administration and political science.

Among his previous appointments, he served as Head, Political Policy Planning Section, and frequent advisor to the SRSG, with the United Nations Mission in Liberia in 2004–05.

References

External links

Zimbabwean officials of the United Nations
Living people
Year of birth missing (living people)